Robert Hughes DeLap (September 26, 1846 – October 30, 1922) was a member of the Wisconsin State Assembly.

Biography
DeLap was born on September 26, 1846, in what is now Green County, Wisconsin. During the American Civil War, he served with the 33rd Wisconsin Volunteer Infantry Regiment of the Union Army. DeLap's places of residence include Viroqua (town), Wisconsin, Viola, Wisconsin and Richland Center, Wisconsin. He worked as a physician. DeLap died on October 30, 1922.

Political career
DeLap was elected to the Assembly in 1888. Additionally, he was a member of the county board of Richland County, Wisconsin and a justice of the peace. He was a Republican. He served as a presidential elector in 1908.

References

External links

People from Green County, Wisconsin
People from Viola, Wisconsin
People from Richland Center, Wisconsin
County supervisors in Wisconsin
Republican Party members of the Wisconsin State Assembly
American justices of the peace
People of Wisconsin in the American Civil War
Union Army soldiers
Physicians from Wisconsin
1846 births
1922 deaths
Burials in Wisconsin